Robibaar (On A  Sunday) is a Bengali romance drama film directed by Atanu Ghosh and produced by Sandeep Agarwal. Released  on 27 December 2019, it stars Prosenjit Chatterjee and Bangladesh actress Jaya Ahsan. under the banner of Echo Entertainment Private Limited.

Plot
Fifteen years after a messy break-up, former lovers Sayani and Asimabha meet again. The wounds haven't healed, and as the day progresses, Sayani, gripped by deep misgivings, tries to leave, again and again. Trust has gone missing between Asimabha and her. The only way the two can now be together is by striking a cut-and-dried, mutually self-serving deal.

Cast
 Prosenjit Chatterjee as Asimabha
 Jaya Ahsan as Sayani
 Shrijato Banerjee as Robi
 Saswati Sinha as Brinda
 Mithun Debnath as Lotkai

References

External links
 

2019 drama films
Indian drama films
2019 films
Films directed by Atanu Ghosh
Bengali-language Indian films
2010s Bengali-language films